Navajo Mountain is a chapter (governing area) straddling the Utah/Arizona border. The bulk of the chapter lies in San Juan County, Utah, with portions in Coconino and Navajo counties in Arizona. It is one of the eighteen chapters which make up the Western Agency, one of five agencies which make up the Navajo Nation. As of the 2010 census, the chapter had a total population of 542, of whom 501 were Navajo.

References

Populated places in San Juan County, Utah
Populated places in Coconino County, Arizona
Populated places in Navajo County, Arizona